The Harem World Tour: Live From Las Vegas (2004) is a live album and video recording of  Sarah Brightman's concert held in Las Vegas, part of her global Harem World Tour.

Video 

The Harem World Tour: Live From Las Vegas is a video recording of classical crossover soprano Sarah Brightman's tour inspired by her album Harem. It was recorded live at the MGM Grand Garden Arena, Las Vegas on 13 March 2004.

Track listing 
"Kama Sutra"
"Harem (Cançao do Mar)"
"Beautiful"
"It's a Beautiful Day"
"Dust in the Wind"
"Who Wants to Live Forever"
"Anytime, Anywhere" (Interlude)
"Anytime, Anywhere"
"Nella Fantasia"
"Stranger in Paradise"
"La Luna"
"Nessun Dorma"
"No One Like You"
"Arabian Nights"
"The War is Over"
"Free"
"What a Wonderful World"
"A Whiter Shade of Pale"
"Phantom of the Opera Suite"
"Wishing You Were Somehow Here Again"
"Time to Say Goodbye"
"The Journey Home"
"A Question of Honour"

Album 

The Harem World Tour: Live From Las Vegas is a live album by classical crossover soprano Sarah Brightman released to coincide with the DVD. The album was released on 28 September 2004. It features a cover version of Indonesian singer Anggun's "Snow on the Sahara".

Charts and certifications

Charts

Certifications
All certifications for the DVD

References

External links 
 

Sarah Brightman albums
Albums produced by Frank Peterson
2004 live albums
2004 video albums
Live video albums
Albums recorded at the MGM Grand Las Vegas